Appu is a 2000 Indian Tamil-language romantic thriller film directed by Vasanth. The movie stars Prashanth, Devayani and Prakash Raj. The music is by Deva. This film is the Tamil remake of Hindi film Sadak (1991). The film was released to mixed reviews, but the critics praised the  performance of Prakash Raj. Television premier was took place on July 27' 2003 for weekend Sunday @4pm.

Plot
Appu is a taxi driver in Mumbai. He had a sister Saradha who committed suicide as her husband sold her to a brothel for money. Appu had a habit of paying prostitutes just to talk to them. One day, Appu meets Seetha and develops affection, but she is also sold by her uncle to a brothel managed by Maharani, a transgender, as he is unable to repay his debt. Appu decides to save Seetha from the brothel by having an affair with Maharani. In the meantime, he finds out his sister was also sold to the same brothel managed by Maharani, so he decides to take revenge. Love blossoms between Appu and Seetha. Appu loses his friend Mano and lover Pooja, as they both get killed by Maharani. They sacrifice their lives for Appu and Seetha. Finally, Appu kills Maharani and unites with Seetha.

Cast

Production
During production, the film was briefly titled as Surya before being renamed to Appu. Simran was considered for the lead role before Devayani was finalised.

This film is the Tamil remake of Hindi film Sadak (1991). Prakash Raj played the character of an eunuch. During the shoot of the film, some eunuchs hailing from Thiruvannamalai, threatened that if portions of the film were not reshot, they would initiate large scale protests and do their best to hinder shooting schedules. They were upset that Raj, played the role of a 'sexually handicapped' person who is the villain. They argued that the eunuchs are treated as socially unwanted having little social standing. With such movies will further threaten their status in the society.

One song is shot in South Africa.

Soundtrack
The film score and the soundtrack were composed by Deva, all song lyrics were by Vairamuthu. The soundtrack, released in 2000, features 5 tracks.

References

2000 films
Films shot in Mumbai
Films about prostitution in India
Films directed by Vasanth
Films scored by Deva (composer)
Tamil remakes of Hindi films
Cross-dressing in Indian films
2000s Tamil-language films
Indian romantic thriller films
2000s romantic thriller films